was a junior college in Hagi, Yamaguchi, Japan and was part of the Hagi Gakuen network.

The institute was founded in 1960 as a professional school. In 1967, the professional school became a junior college. It closed in 2000.

External links
 Hagi Women's Junior College 

Educational institutions established in 1967
Japanese junior colleges